Lauren Beck is an American film producer, best known for producing the critically acclaimed film Manchester by the Sea (2016), which earned her an Academy Award for Best Picture nomination with Matt Damon, Kimberly Steward, Chris Moore, and Kevin J. Walsh.

Filmography
She was a producer in all films unless otherwise noted.

Film

Production manager

Thanks

Awards and nominations 
 Nominated: Academy Award for Best Picture - Manchester by the Sea

References

External links
 

Living people
American film producers
Year of birth missing (living people)